Gel Sefid (also Romanized as Gel Sefīd and Gel Safīd; also known as Gala Safīd and Qala Safid) is a village in Badr Rural District, in the Central District of Ravansar County, Kermanshah Province, Iran. At the 2006 census, its population was 1,530, in 353 families.

References 

Populated places in Ravansar County